Caelopygus elegans is a species of harvestmen in the genus Caelopygus. It is found in Brazil.

References

External links 

 

Harvestmen
Animals described in 1833
Arthropods of Brazil
Taxa named by Maximilian Perty